Chiang Mai Zoo and Aquarium is a  zoo on Huay Kaew Road, Chiang Mai Province, Thailand, just west of Chiang Mai University. It is the first commercial zoo in northern Thailand, established on 16 June 1977.

History
In 1950 the US government sent military advisers to train tribal police along the border of Thailand. Among them was Harold Mason Young, son of American missionaries, who had been born in Burma. Young started helping injured animals, and his collection started getting  visitors. The Chiang Mai provincial government set aside  at the base of Doi Suthep, the mountain immediately adjacent to Chiang Mai, and the facility was opened to the public in 1957.

When Young died in 1974, the property was taken over by Chiang Mai Province. The zoo was expanded to its current  footprint, transferred to the Zoological Park Organization under the patronage of the King of Thailand, and opened as the official zoo of Chang Mai Province in 1977.

Exhibits

Chiang Mai Zoo is privately operated and includes a large variety of animals. In addition, it provides two large aquariums. On 28 October 2008, an aquatic tunnel with a length of —the world's longest tunnel aquarium— was opened to the public. It also has a marine aquarium, which is the largest in Asia.

Animals

Overall, 400 animal species are represented in the zoo including Humboldt penguin, Cape fur seal, koala, Indian rhinoceros, hippopotamus, greater flamingo, gaur, red-shanked douc, Bornean orangutan, African spurred tortoise, Asiatic black bear, Malayan sun bear, giant anteater, Indochinese tiger, Barbary sheep, Malayan tapir, and many types of reptiles. The zoo is also home to two Asian elephants and three giant pandas.

Giant pandas Lin Hui and Chuang Chuang arrived at the zoo on 12 October 2003, and are on 10-year loan from China. Their daughter Lin Bing was born at the zoo on 27 May 2009, and will be returned to China when she is two years old. Lin Bing is one of just a few giant pandas born in captivity outside China.

The aquarium has many sea creatures, including invertebrates and Asian arowana.  It also has carnivorous fish such as sharks.

Transportation
The  Chiang Mai Zoo Monorail was opened in 2005. It ceased operations in 2014. The zoo also has trams that take visitors around the zoo for a charge.

See also
Chiang Mai Night Safari
Dusit Zoo

References

External links 

  

Monorails in Thailand
Zoo
Zoos in Thailand
Organizations established in 1977
Tourist attractions in Chiang Mai
1977 establishments in Thailand
1957 establishments in Thailand
Zoos established in 1957
1970s in Chiang Mai